Central Library in Edinburgh, Scotland, opened in 1890, was the first public library building in the city. Edinburgh Central library comprises six libraries: Lending, Reference, Music, Art and Design, Edinburgh and Scottish and the Children's Library.

History 
Today there are 28 public libraries in Edinburgh but, as the first to open in the Scottish capital, the creation of Central Library was funded with £50,000 by philanthropist Andrew Carnegie. At the opening ceremony a telegram from Carnegie was read out stating: "We trust that this Library is to grow in usefulness year after year, and prove one of the most potent agencies for the good of the people for all time to come."

The site selected for the library was the former home of Sir Thomas Hope, 1st Baronet Hope of Craighall, advocate for King Charles I. The structure, built in 1616, was demolished in March 1887 to make way for the library.  The lintel from Hope's home, bearing the carved inscription TECUM HABITA 1616 from the fourth satire of Persius, is preserved above an inner doorway of the library.

Carnegie's funding was initially an offer of £25,000 in 1886 which was doubled, overcoming prior opposition to the establishment of a public library, the city—last of those to do so in Scotland—adopted the Public Libraries Act and on 9 July 1887, Carnegie laid the foundation stone of architect George Washington Browne's French Renaissance-styled building.

Washington Browne's design was the winning entry in the architectural competition for the new library and was selected from 37 submissions. His grand building stands three levels tall above George IV Bridge and reaches down to the Cowgate below, spanning the disjointed streets of Edinburgh's Old Town.

Above the main door is the motto, "Let there be Light" which Carnegie insisted was placed above the entrance to every library he funded. The facade of Central Library is also decorated with stone carvings depicting the coat of arms of the City of Edinburgh, Coat of Arms of Scotland and the Royal Arms. There are nine small square reliefs relating to printers and a large sculpture of Caledonia by Alexander Handyside Ritchie.

Records for 1890, the first full year the library was open, show that over 440,000 book loans were issued.

Central library has been adapted and expanded many times over the years. Only a year after opening the library was already running out of space and a book store was added in 1903. By 1928, the library was short of space again. Proposals were made for a better use of the space and a public lift was installed.

In 1930, the adjacent building at no.3 George IV Bridge was acquired allowing the library to expand again. Further nearby premises were bought in the 1940s and in 1961, a mezzanine level was created above the former Newspaper Room.

In May 2014, the new children's and music libraries were opened within the main library building. These had previously been housed in a separate building on George IV Bridge. The children's library features a wall graphic by award-winning children's book illustrator Catherine Rayner.

In November 2017, on the 100th anniversary of her death, a memorial to Dr Elsie Inglis, the founder of the Scottish Women's Hospitals, was unveiled at Central Library.

Collections 

As with all public libraries in Edinburgh, adult collections are organised using the Library of Congress Classification system. Since Wigan dropped the system during a 1974 local government reorganisation, Edinburgh is the only municipality in the UK continuing to use it. Children's books are organised under the more-widespread Dewey Decimal Classification scheme.

Edinburgh Central Library holds in its collections three of the Scottish book sculptures, which are on display in its main foyer. The sculptures were the work of an anonymous artist who left these artworks among a series of other in literary venues during the Edinburgh International Book Festival in 2011. The sculptures in the collection depict a magnifying glass, a teacup and a small figure 'lost in a book'.

Filming Location

Edinburgh Central Library was used as a filming location for the TV series Rebus, during episode one Black & Blue. Outside building shots were taken and as well as a scene in the reference section.

Gallery

References

Bibliography

External links 
City of Edinburgh Council page for the library
Central Library - Facebook page

 

Library buildings completed in 1890
Libraries in Edinburgh
Category A listed buildings in Edinburgh
Listed library buildings in Scotland
1890 establishments in Scotland
Public libraries in Scotland
Carnegie libraries in Scotland
Renaissance Revival architecture in the United Kingdom
Libraries established in 1890
Domes